Plošča Franciška Bahuševiča is a Minsk Metro station. It is located on the square of the same name. The station was opened on November 6, 2020.

Gallery

References

Minsk Metro stations
Railway stations opened in 2020